Electoral district of Abbotsford was an electoral district of the Legislative Assembly in the Australian state of Victoria.

Abbotsford was created by the post-Federation Electoral Districts Boundaries Act 1903
coming into effect in 1904 when 42 districts were abolished (including Jolimont and West Richmond) and 24 new ones created resulting in 65 districts.

The district of Abbotsford was defined as: 

 now Alexandra Parade 
 now Bridge Road

Members

Beazley had previously represented Collingwood from April 1889 to May 1904
Webber went on to represent Heidelberg from April 1927 to April 1932

Election results

References

Former electoral districts of Victoria (Australia)
1904 establishments in Australia
1927 disestablishments in Australia